Mouchak Market is one of the oldest and famous markets in Dhaka city. It was probably situated in the 1940s. It was also one of the most famous markets at the time and was mostly visited by the British and French rulers over Dhaka. It is known to be the General Meeting Building of the Royal British Family.

Location
Accurate position is in Malibag, Dhaka. But for mass people we can consider it is situated between Siddeshwari and Malibag, which is one of the busiest places in Dhaka city. However, the market is an icon for the area; many people, from Dhaka and outside, recognize the area by 'Mouchak More'.

Description
It is five-storey building. There are fast food shops in the ground floor, jewellery in the 1st floor, plastic and others in the 2nd floor and tri-piece, sharee in the 3rd floor. There is a mosque and a Chinese restaurant (Euro garden) in the 4th floor. Around 3,000 to 4,000 people come to this market every day. But it increases exponentially during the festival Eid-ul-fitr. Every shop here is very profitable.

Holiday

Thursday (full) & Friday (half), Eid-ul-azha (4 days), Eid-ul-fitr (4 days), general assembly and other essential government holidays.

See also
 List of shopping malls in Bangladesh

References

Retail markets in Bangladesh